Idrissa Doumbia (born 14 April 1998) is an Ivorian professional footballer who plays as a defensive midfielder for Süper Lig club Alanyaspor, on loan from Portuguese club Sporting CP.

Club career
Doumbia made his Anderlecht debut on 30 July 2016 in the first game of the Jupiler Pro League 2016–17 season against Royal Excel Mouscron. In the 2017 Belgian Super Cup he made his first start for Zulte Waregem, against his parent club, Anderlecht.

On 29 June 2018, he signed with the Russian Premier League club FC Akhmat Grozny.

On 15 January 2019, he moved to Portugal, signing a contract with Sporting until 2024 with a €60 million release clause. On 5 October of the following year, he was loaned to La Liga side SD Huesca, for one year.

On 31 August 2021, he returned to Zulte Waregem on loan for the 2021–22 season.

International career
Doumbia made his debut for the Ivory Coast U20 in a 3–2 friendly win over the Qatar U20s on 21 March 2016.

Doumbia debuted for the Ivory Coast U23s in a pair of 2019 Africa U-23 Cup of Nations qualification matches in March 2019.

Career statistics

Honours
Sporting
Taça de Portugal: 2018–19

Ivory Coast U23
Africa U-23 Cup of Nations runner-up:2019

References

External links

1998 births
Living people
People from Yamoussoukro
Ivorian footballers
Association football midfielders
Ivory Coast under-20 international footballers
R.S.C. Anderlecht players
S.V. Zulte Waregem players
FC Akhmat Grozny players
Sporting CP footballers
SD Huesca footballers
Alanyaspor footballers
Belgian Pro League players
Russian Premier League players
La Liga players
Süper Lig players
Ivorian expatriate footballers
Ivorian expatriate sportspeople in Belgium
Ivorian expatriate sportspeople in Russia
Ivorian expatriate sportspeople in Portugal
Ivorian expatriate sportspeople in Spain
Expatriate footballers in Belgium
Expatriate footballers in Russia
Expatriate footballers in Portugal
Expatriate footballers in Spain
Footballers at the 2020 Summer Olympics
Olympic footballers of Ivory Coast